The Grantland Rice Bowl was an annual college football bowl game from 1964 through 1977, in the NCAA's College Division, for smaller universities and colleges, and later Division II.  The game was named for Grantland Rice, an early 20th century American sportswriter known for his elegant prose, and was originally played in his hometown of Murfreesboro, Tennessee.

History

College Division
Prior to 1973, the NCAA was divided into two divisions, University and College. National champions in each division were determined by polls taken by the AP (a panel of writers) and UPI (coaches) at the end of the regular season. From 1964 to 1972, there were four regional finals in the College Division, to determine regional champions for the East, Mideast, Midwest, and West – these bowl games were played after the AP and UPI polls had been completed. The Grantland Rice Bowl was the College Division's Mideast regional championship game. The other three regional finals were the Tangerine (later Boardwalk), Pecan (later Pioneer), and Camellia bowls.

The intent for the Mideast game was to match the two best teams from nine states; Alabama, Illinois, Indiana, Kentucky, Michigan, Mississippi, Ohio, Tennessee, and Wisconsin. In 1967, Louisiana was added to the Mideast region. From 1964 to 1968, the game was played at Horace Jones Field in Murfreesboro. In 1969, due to cold weather and declining attendance at the Tennessee bowl site, the game was relocated to Baton Rouge, Louisiana, where it was played at BREC Memorial Stadium through 1973.

Division II
In 1973, the College Division was realigned into Division II and Division III, with full eight-team playoffs to determine a national champion in both divisions.  The Grantland Rice Bowl became a national semifinal game in Division II, along with the Pioneer Bowl in Wichita Falls, Texas, with the winners advancing to the Camellia Bowl championship game in Sacramento, California. In 1974 and 1975, the game was played at the larger capacity Tiger Stadium, also in Baton Rouge. In 1976, the format was changed to have the game hosted by one of the participating teams; the 1976 game was played in Fargo, North Dakota, and the 1977 game was played in Anniston, Alabama. The other semifinal in those two seasons was the Knute Rockne Bowl, and the championship game was the Pioneer Bowl in Texas. HBCUs were banned from taking part.

Game results

College Division

Division II

Appearances by team
Teams with more than one appearance are listed.

References

External links
 

 
College football bowls in Alabama
College football bowls in Louisiana
College football in North Dakota
College football bowls in Tennessee
NCAA Division II football
Sports competitions in Baton Rouge, Louisiana
Defunct college football bowls